Chiloglanis pretoriae, the shortspine suckermouth, is a species of upside-down catfish native to Eswatini, Mozambique, South Africa and Zimbabwe where it occurs in the Limpopo, Komati, Zambezi, Pungwe and Buzi River systems.  This species grows to a length of  SL.

References

pretoriae
Freshwater fish of Africa
Fish of Mozambique
Fish of South Africa
Fish of Eswatini
Fish of Zimbabwe
Fish described in 1931